"Eagle in a Cage" was an American television movie broadcast on  October 20, 1965, as part of the television series, Hallmark Hall of Fame. It told the story of Napoleon at Saint Helena.

Millard Lampell was the writer and George Schaefer the producer and director. Trevor Howard starred as Napoleon. The production was nominated for six Emmy Awards and won two.

Plot
The movie tells the story of Napoleon during his exile by Great Britain to the island of Saint Helena. After his efforts to escape are unsuccessful, Napoleon (played by Trevor Howard) writes his memoir and befriends a local girl Betsy Balcombe (played by Pamela Franklin).

Cast
The cast included:

 Trevor Howard as Napoleon
 James Daly as Dr. O'Meara
 George Rose as Cipriani
 Pamela Franklin as Betsy Balcombe
 Richard Waring as Bertrand
 William Smithers as Gourgaud
 Basil Langton as Sir Hudson Lowe
 Jacqueline Bertrand as Mme. Bertrand
 Frederic Warriner as Las Cases
 Guy Spaull as Lord Keith
 Norman Barrs as The Sentry

Production
The movie was broadcast on  October 20, 1965, as the season opener of the 15th season of the television series, Hallmark Hall of Fame. 
Millard Lampell was the writer and George Schaefer the producer and director.

The production was nominated in six categories at the 18th Primetime Emmy Awards. Millard Lampell won the Emmy for outstanding writing achievement in drama, and James Daly won for outstanding performance by an actor in a supporting role in a drama. The remaining nominations were as outstanding dramatic program, for Trevor Howard for outstanding performance by an actor in a leading role, or Pamela Franklin as outstanding performance by an actress in a supporting role, and for George Schaefer for outstanding directorial achievement in drama.

References

1962 television films
American drama television films
1962 films
1960s American films